Natalia Prișcepa (born 17 October 1989) is a Moldovan weightlifter. She competed in the women's 75 kg event at the 2016 Summer Olympics.

Major results

References

External links
 

1989 births
Living people
Moldovan female weightlifters
Olympic weightlifters of Moldova
Weightlifters at the 2016 Summer Olympics
European Weightlifting Championships medalists
Place of birth missing (living people)
20th-century Moldovan women
21st-century Moldovan women